Christopher George Hargrave (born 31 August 1951 in Kiveton Park, Yorkshire) was an English born cricket player, who moved to Australia and played for the Tasmanian Tigers. He was a right-handed batsman and wicket-keeper who occasionally represented Tasmania from 1976 until 1981.

See also
 List of Tasmanian representative cricketers

External links
Cricinfo Profile

1951 births
Living people
Australian cricketers
Tasmania cricketers
English emigrants to Australia
People from Kiveton Park
Wicket-keepers